The St. Louis Jr. Blues are a Tier III ice hockey team in the North American 3 Hockey League (NA3HL). The team plays their home games at the Affton Ice Rink in Affton, Missouri, a suburb of St. Louis, Missouri.

History
The team was formed in 1978 in the St. Louis Metro Junior B Hockey League by the St. Louis Blues president and general manager Emile Francis. In 1987, the Jr. Blues merged with the Affton Americans organization and competed in the North American Junior Hockey League, Junior B Division. The Jr. Blues competed in junior B division of USA Hockey's Tier III level. During this time, the team won the Jr. B National Championship in 2004, 2005, 2006, and 2007. In 2007, the Jr. Blues and their league, the Central States Hockey League, were promoted to Jr. A status. In 2010, the Jr. Blues won the Tier III Jr. A National Championship.

Season-by-season records

USA Hockey Tier III Junior A National Championships

Alumni
The Jr. Blues have had many alumni move on to, higher levels of junior ice hockey, NCAA Division I, Division III, ACHA College, at professional levels, including the NHL.

Notable alumni include: 
 Chris Butler - St. Louis Blues (NHL), University of Denver (WCHA)
 Michael Davies - Bridgeport Sound Tigers (AHL), University of Wisconsin- Madison (WCHA)
 Cal Heeter - Ohio State University (CCHA), Philadelphia Flyers (NHL), Grand Rapids Griffins (AHL)
 Paul Stastny - St. Louis Blues (NHL), University of Denver (WCHA)
 Yan Stastny - St. Louis Blues (NHL)
 Travis Turnbull - Portland Pirates (AHL), University of Michigan (CCHA)
 Joe Vitale - Arizona Coyotes (NHL), Northeastern University (Hockey East)

References

External links 
Official site

Jr Blues
Amateur ice hockey teams in Missouri
1978 establishments in Missouri
Ice hockey clubs established in 1978
St. Louis Blues